In mathematics and  physics, a quantum graph is a linear, network-shaped structure  of vertices connected on edges (i.e., a graph) in which each edge is given a length and where a differential (or pseudo-differential) equation is posed on each edge. An example would be a power network consisting of power lines (edges) connected at transformer stations (vertices); the differential equations would then describe the voltage along each of the lines, with boundary conditions for each edge provided at the adjacent vertices ensuring that the current added over all edges adds to zero at each vertex.

Quantum graphs were first studied by Linus Pauling as models of free electrons in organic molecules in the 1930s. They also arise in a variety of mathematical contexts, e.g. as model systems in quantum chaos, in the study of waveguides, in photonic crystals and in Anderson localization, or as limit on shrinking thin wires.  Quantum graphs have become prominent models in mesoscopic physics used to obtain a theoretical understanding of nanotechnology. Another, more simple notion of quantum graphs was introduced by Freedman et al.

Aside from actually solving the differential equations posed on a quantum graph for purposes of concrete applications, typical questions that arise are those of controllability (what inputs have to be provided to bring the system into a desired state, for example providing sufficient power to all houses on a power network) and identifiability (how and where one has to measure something to obtain a complete picture of the state of the system, for example measuring the pressure of a water pipe network to determine whether or not there is a leaking pipe).

Metric graphs 

A metric graph
is a graph consisting of a set  of vertices and 
a set  of edges where each edge  has been associated 
with an interval  so that  is the coordinate on the 
The choice of which vertex lies at zero is 
arbitrary with the alternative corresponding to a change of coordinate on the 
edge.
The graph has a natural metric: for  two 
points  on the graph,  is 
the shortest distance between them
where distance is measured along the edges of the graph.

Open graphs: in the combinatorial graph model 
edges always join pairs of vertices however in a quantum graph one may also 
consider semi-infinite edges.  These are edges associated with the interval 
A graph with one or more 
such open edges is referred to as an open graph.

Quantum graphs 

Quantum graphs are metric graphs equipped with a differential 
(or pseudo-differential) operator acting on functions on the graph.  
A function  on a metric graph is defined as the -tuple of functions
 on the intervals.   
The Hilbert space of the graph is 
where the inner product of two functions is

 may be infinite in the case of an open edge.  The simplest example of an operator on a metric graph is the Laplace operator.  The operator on an edge is  where  is the coordinate on the edge.  To make the operator self-adjoint a suitable domain must be specified.  This is typically achieved by taking the Sobolev space  of functions on the edges of the graph and specifying matching conditions at the vertices.

The trivial example of matching conditions that make the operator self-adjoint are the Dirichlet boundary conditions,  for every edge.  An eigenfunction on a finite edge may be written as

for integer .  If the graph is closed with no infinite edges and the 
lengths of the edges of the graph are rationally independent
then an eigenfunction is supported on a single graph edge 
The Dirichlet conditions 
don't allow interaction between the intervals so the spectrum is the same as 
that of the set of disconnected edges.

More interesting self-adjoint matching conditions that allow interaction between edges are the Neumann or natural matching conditions.  A function  in the domain of the operator is continuous everywhere on the graph and the sum of the outgoing derivatives at a vertex is zero,

The properties of other operators on metric graphs have also been studied.  
 These include the more general class of Schrödinger operators,

 Another example is the Dirac operator on a graph which is a matrix valued operator acting on vector valued functions that describe the quantum mechanics of particles with an intrinsic angular momentum of one half such as the electron.
 The Dirichlet-to-Neumann operator on a graph is a pseudo-differential operator that arises in the  study of photonic crystals.

Theorems 

All self-adjoint matching conditions of the Laplace operator on a graph can be classified according to a scheme of Kostrykin and Schrader. In practice, it is often more convenient to adopt a formalism introduced by Kuchment, see, which automatically yields an operator in variational form.

Let  be a vertex with  edges emanating from it. For a function  on the graph let

 
Matching conditions at  can be specified by a pair of matrices 
 and  through the linear equation,

The matching conditions define a self-adjoint operator if 
 has the maximal rank  and 

The spectrum of the Laplace operator on a finite graph can be conveniently described 
using a scattering matrix approach introduced by Kottos and Smilansky
.  The eigenvalue problem on an edge is,

So a solution on the edge can be written as a linear combination of plane waves.

where in a time-dependent Schrödinger equation  is the coefficient 
The matching conditions at  define a scattering matrix

The scattering matrix relates the vectors of incoming and outgoing plane-wave 
For self-adjoint matching conditions  is unitary.  An element of 
from a directed edge 
However, for a large class of matching conditions 
With Neumann matching conditions for example

Substituting in the equation for  
produces -independent transition amplitudes

where  is the Kronecker delta function that is one if  and 
zero otherwise.  From the transition amplitudes we may define a 
 matrix

 is called the bond scattering matrix and 
can be thought of as a quantum evolution operator on the graph.  It is
unitary and acts on the vector of  plane-wave coefficients for the 
graph where  is the coefficient of 
The phase  is the phase acquired by the plane wave 
when propagating from vertex  to vertex .

Quantization condition: An eigenfunction on the graph 
can be defined through its associated  plane-wave coefficients.
As the eigenfunction is stationary under the quantum evolution a quantization 
condition for the graph can be written using the evolution operator.

Eigenvalues  occur at values of  where the matrix  has an 
eigenvalue one.  We will order the spectrum with 
.

The first trace formula for a graph was derived by Roth (1983).
In 1997 Kottos and Smilansky used the quantization condition above to obtain
the following trace formula for the Laplace operator on a graph when the
The trace formula links the spectrum with periodic orbits on the graph.

 is called the density of states.  The right hand side of the trace 
formula is made up of two terms, the Weyl 
term  
is the mean separation of eigenvalues and the oscillating part is a sum 
over all periodic orbits  on the graph.  
 is the length of the orbit and 
 is
the total length of the graph.  For an orbit generated by repeating a 
shorter primitive orbit,  counts the number of repartitions.  
 is 
the product of the transition amplitudes at the vertices of the graph around 
the orbit.

Applications 

Quantum graphs were first employed in the 1930s 
to model the spectrum of free electrons in organic molecules like 
Naphthalene, see figure.  As a first approximation the 
atoms are taken to be vertices while the 
σ-electrons form bonds that fix a frame
in the shape of the molecule on which the free electrons are confined.

A similar problem appears when considering quantum waveguides.  These 
are mesoscopic systems - systems built with a width on the scale of
nanometers.  A quantum waveguide can be thought of as a fattened graph 
where the edges
are thin tubes.  The spectrum of the Laplace operator on this domain
converges to the spectrum of the Laplace operator on the graph
under certain conditions.  Understanding mesoscopic systems plays an 
important role in the field of nanotechnology.

In 1997 Kottos and Smilansky proposed quantum graphs as a model to study  
quantum chaos, the quantum mechanics of systems that 
are classically chaotic.  Classical motion on the graph can be defined as 
a probabilistic Markov chain where the probability of scattering 
from edge  to edge  is given by the absolute value of the 
quantum transition amplitude squared, .  For almost all 
finite connected 
quantum graphs the probabilistic dynamics is ergodic and mixing, 
in other words chaotic.

Quantum graphs embedded in two or three dimensions appear in the study
of photonic crystals.  In two dimensions a simple model of 
a photonic crystal consists of polygonal cells of a dense dielectric with 
narrow interfaces between the cells filled with air.  Studying 
dielectric modes that stay mostly in the dielectric gives rise to a 
pseudo-differential operator on the graph that follows the narrow interfaces.

periodic systems and quantum graphs have been applied 
to the study the phenomena of Anderson localization where localized 
states occur at the edge of spectral bands in the presence of disorder.

See also 

Schild's Ladder, a novel dealing with a fictional quantum graph theory
Feynman diagram

References 

Quantum mechanics
Extensions and generalizations of graphs